George White may refer to:

Politicians
George White (died 1584) (c. 1530–1584), MP for Liverpool
George White (Liberal politician) (1840–1912), British Liberal Member of Parliament, 1900–1912
George E. White (politician) (1848–1935), U.S. congressman from Illinois
George Henry White (1852–1918), Republican congressman from North Carolina
George Stanley White (1897–1977), speaker of the Canadian Senate
George White (Ohio politician) (1872–1953), U.S. congressman, governor of Ohio
George W. White (Canadian politician) (1827–1912), political figure in New Brunswick, Canada
George W. White (American politician), Reconstruction era state legislator in Mississippi
George White (Australian politician) (1905–1986), member of the Victorian Legislative Assembly
George Boyle White (1802–1876), New South Wales politician
George L. White, member of the Legislative Assembly of New Brunswick

Sports
George White (speedway rider), English speedway rider
George White (footballer, born 1892) (1892–1953), Australian rules footballer for Carlton
George White (footballer, born 1908) (1908–1966), Australian rules footballer for St Kilda
George White (Canadian football) (born 1977), Canadian Football League

Others
George A. White (1880–1941), American author, journalist and U.S. Army general
George E. White (missionary) (1861–1946), Christian missionary and witness to the Armenian Genocide
George H. White, nom de plume of Pascual Enguídanos (1923–2006), Spanish writer
George Leonard White (1838–1895), founder and first director of the Fisk Jubilee Singers
George M. White (1920–2011), American architect
George Robert White (1847–1922), Boston philanthropist
George White (British Army officer) (1835–1912), British field marshal, recipient of the Victoria Cross
George Washington White (1931–2011), United States federal judge
George White (archdeacon) (died 1929), Irish Anglican priest
George White (artist) (c. 1684–1732), known for plumbago drawing
Sir George White, 1st Baronet (1854–1916), British businessman, founder of Bristol Aeroplane Company
George White (dean of Cashel), Irish Anglican priest
George White (film editor) (1911–1998), American film editor
George White (producer) (1891–1968), film and stage producer, known for George White's Scandals
George White (preacher) (1802–1887), Episcopalian preacher, amateur historian, and archaeologist in Georgia, United States
George W. White (educator), president of the University of Southern California, 1895–1899
George White (1813–1876), tailor and vigneron in South Australia, founder of White's Rooms 
George White (merchant) (1648–?), English merchant and co-founder of the reformed East India Company
George White, American murder victim

See also
George Whyte (1933–2012), English author, composer, dramatist and art collector
George Whyte (footballer) (1909–1992), Scottish professional footballer